The 1890 Dartmouth football team represented Dartmouth College as a member of the Eastern Intercollegiate Football Association (EIFA) during the 1890 college football season. Dartmouth compiled an overall record of 4–4 with a mark of 1–2 in EIFA play. Charles O. Gill, capatain of the 1889 Yale Bulldogs football team spent two weeks coaching the team in September 1890. Frank Lakeman was the team's captain.

Schedule

References

Dartmouth
Dartmouth Big Green football seasons
Dartmouth football